West Oaks Mall is a local mall located in Ocoee, Florida near Orlando. It is anchored by Dillard's Clearance Center, J. C. Penney, a SunPass Customer Service Center, and a Bed Bath & Beyond Call Center, and has 115 store spaces, a food court, and a 14-screen AMC theater.

History 
The West Oaks Mall, originally called the Lake Lotta Mall, was announced in April 1995 when the Homart Development Company bought 130 acres of land for the mall. Designed by the Atlanta based design firm Thompson, Ventulett, Steinbeck, and Associates, the mall was slated to be a total of 950,000 sq ft, with anchors Sears, Dillard's, Gayfers, and JCPenney as well as 125 specialty stores and a multi-screen theater. By June 1996, the mall, now managed by General Growth Properties after their takeover of Homart's mall-development arm, had reached 73% occupancy, with the opening pushed back to October 2. In September 1996, it was announced the mall was to feature a 600 sq ft playground, designed by International Inc of New Braunfels, Texas. The mall opened October 2 to a crowd of 30,000 people.

In December 1996, AMC Theatres requested to be able to expand their planned 14-screen theater into a 24-screen theater, however this was not approved. The 14-screen theater opened on March 19, 1997.

The Gayfers location was sold to Parisian in 1998, after its acquisition by Dillard's that year. In February 2004, it was announced that the Parisian location would be converted to McRae's, which it operated as for around a year, when the location was sold to Belk in April 2005. In 2008, it was announced that the Belk location at the mall would be closing by the end of February. At the time, owners GGP had announced speculative plans to demolish the anchor building for lifestyle-center style tenants, but this never occurred.

In 2012, it was announced that Sears would be closing its location at the mall by January 2013, along with 10 others, with plans to sell the properties to GGP. The space remained vacant until 2016, when it was converted into a customer service center for SunPass, operated by Xerox Corp. In November 2012, the mall was purchased by Moonbeam Capital Investments, for $15.9 million. In 2017, it was announced that a call center operated by Bed Bath & Beyond would take over half of the former Belk anchor, with plans to create 500 jobs by 2018.

The small tenants at the mall that are still open as of May 2022 include Banter by Piercing Pagoda, Bath & Body Works, Champs Sports, Jimmy Jazz, Rainbow, Spencer's Gifts, and Underground by Journeys.

Foot Locker and The Children's Place closed earlier in 2022.

Anchors and tenants
 AMC Theatres (1997-present) (opened 1997)
 Bed Bath & Beyond Call Center (2017-present) (opened 2017 in portion of former Belk)
 Dillard's Clearance Center (1996-present) (opened 1996 with the mall, downgraded to a clearance center later in the store's lifespan)
 JCPenney (1996-present) (opened 1996 with the mall)
 SunPass Customer Service Center (2016-present) (opened 2016 in former Sears)

Former anchors and tenants
 Belk (2005-2008) (opened 2005 in former McRae's, closed 2008 and a portion replaced by Bed Bath & Beyond call center in 2017)
 Gayfers (1996-1998) (opened 1996 with the mall, closed 1998 and replaced by Parisian)
 McRae's (2004-2005) (opened 2004 in former Parisian, closed 2005 and replaced by Belk)
 Parisian (1998-2004) (opened 1998 in former Gayfers, closed 2004 and replaced by McRae's)
 Sears (1996-2013) (opened 1996 with the mall, closed 2013 and replaced by SunPass customer service center in 2016)

References

External links
West Oaks Mall  Official website
Moonbeam Capital Investments  Official website

Shopping malls in Florida
Buildings and structures in Orange County, Florida
Tourist attractions in Orange County, Florida
Shopping malls established in 1996
Ocoee, Florida
1996 establishments in Florida